Jae-in is a Korean unisex given name. Its meaning differs based on the hanja used to write each syllable of the name. There are 20 hanja with the reading "jae" and 29 hanja with the reading "in" on the South Korean government's official list of hanja which may be registered for use in given names. According to statistics of the Supreme Court, among 852,614 South Koreans who changed their names between October 2012 and October 2017, Jae-in was the 336th-most popular new name, chosen by 531 people over that period. It did not experience any boost in popularity following the election of Moon Jae-in as president of South Korea, though it was still the most popular new name among the given names of the past five presidents.

People with this name include:
Moon Jae-in (born 1953), 19th President of South Korea
Tak Jae-in, South Korean male voice actor
Jang Jae-in (born 1992), South Korean female singer-songwriter
Lee Jae-in (born 2004), South Korean actress

See also
List of Korean given names

References

Korean unisex given names